The Bishop of Ely is the ordinary of the Church of England Diocese of Ely in the Province of Canterbury.  The diocese roughly covers the county of Cambridgeshire (with the exception of the Soke of Peterborough), together with a section of north-west Norfolk and has its episcopal see in the City of Ely, Isle of Ely in Cambridgeshire, where the seat is located at the Cathedral Church of the Holy Trinity. The current bishop is Stephen Conway, who signs +Stephen Elien: (abbreviation of the Latin adjective Eliensis, meaning "of Ely"). The diocesan bishops resided at the Bishop's Palace, Ely until 1941; they now reside in Bishop's House, the former cathedral deanery. Conway became Bishop of Ely in 2010, translated from the Diocese of Salisbury where he was Bishop suffragan of Ramsbury.

The roots of the Diocese of Ely are ancient and the area of Ely was part of the patrimony of Saint Etheldreda. Prior to the elevation of Ely Cathedral as the seat of the diocese, it existed as first as a convent of religious sisters and later as a monastery.  It was led by first by an abbess and later by an abbot.  The convent was founded in the city in 673. After St Etheldreda's death in 679 she was buried outside the church. Her remains were later translated inside, the foundress being commemorated as a great Anglican saint. The monastery, and much of the city of Ely, were destroyed in the Danish invasions that began in 869 or 870. A new Benedictine monastery was built and endowed on the site by Saint Athelwold, Bishop of Winchester, in 970, in a wave of monastic refoundations which also included Peterborough and Ramsey. In the Domesday Book in 1086, the Bishop of Ely is referenced as a landholder of Foxehola. This became a cathedral in 1109, after a new Diocese of Ely was created out of land taken from the Diocese of Lincoln. From that time the line of bishops begins.

History
The earliest historical notice of Ely is given by the Venerable Bede who writes (Historia ecclesiastica gentis Anglorum, IV, xix):

This district was assigned in 649 to saint Æthelthryth, daughter of Anna, king of the East Angles, as a dowry in her marriage with Tonbert of the South Girvii. After her second marriage to Ecgfrith of Northumbria, she became a nun, and in 673 returned to Ely and founded a monastery on the site of the present cathedral. As endowment she gave it her entire principality of the isle, from which subsequent Bishops of Ely derived their temporal power. Æthelthryth died in 679 and her shrine became a place of pilgrimage. In 870 the monastery was destroyed by the Danes, having already given to the Church four sainted abbesses, Æthelthryth and her sister Seaxburgh, the latter's daughter Ermenilda, and Ermenilda's daughter Werburgh. Probably under their rule there was a community of monks as well as a convent of nuns, but when in 970 the monastery was restored by King Edgar and Ethelwold it was a foundation for monks only.

For more than a century the monastery flourished, and about the year 1105 Abbot Richard suggested the creation of the See of Ely, to relieve the enormous Diocese of Lincoln. The pope's brief erecting the new bishopric was issued 21 November 1108, and on 17 October 1109 King Henry I granted his charter, the first bishop being Hervé le Breton, or Harvey (1109–1131), former Bishop of Bangor. The monastery church thus became one of the "conventual" cathedrals. Of this building the transepts and two bays of the nave already existed, and in 1170 the nave as it stands to-day (a complete and perfect specimen of late Norman work) was finished. As the bishops succeeded to the principality of St Etheldreda they enjoyed palatine power and great resources.

The Bishops of Ely frequently held high office in the State and the roll includes many names of famous statesmen, including eight Lord Chancellors and six Lord Treasurers. The Bishops of Ely spent much of their wealth on their cathedral, with the result that Ely can show examples of Gothic architecture of many periods.  Another of the Bishop’s Palaces was in Wisbech on the site of the former Wisbech Castle. Thurloe's mansion which replaced it was allowed to fall into disrepair and sold to Joseph Medworth.
They also had a London residence called Ely Place.

Among the bishops Geoffry Riddell (1174–1189) built the nave and began the west tower, Eustace (1198–1215) the West Porch, while Hugh de Northwold (1229–1254) rebuilt the Norman choir and John Hotham (1316–1337) rebuilt the collapsed central tower – the famous Octagon. Hugh (or Hugo) de Balsham (1258–1286) founded Peterhouse, the first college at the University of Cambridge, while John Alcock (1486–1500) was the founder of Jesus College and completed the building of the bishop's palace at Wisbech, commenced in 1478 by his predecessor John Morton later Archbishop of Canterbury.

Goodrich was a reformer and during his episcopate the monastery was dissolved. The last bishop in communion with the see of Rome was Thomas Thirlby. Since the Reformation, notable bishops have included Lancelot Andrewes, Matthew Wren, Peter Gunning and Simon Patrick who, in 1695 gave the Shambles estate in Wisbech, to provide clothing for the poor.

List of abbesses and abbots

Convent of sisters (673–870)
Etheldreda (673–679)
Seaxburh (sister of Etheldreda; 679–c.699)
Ermenilda (daughter of Seaxburh and Eorcenberht of Kent; c.699–c.700)
Werburh (born c.675, daughter of Ermenilda and Wulfhere of Mercia)
?

Benedictine monastery (970–1109) 
Brythnoth (970–996/999)
Ælfsige (996/999–1016)
Leofwine (1019–1022, 1022–1023)
Leofric (1022, 1023–1029)
Leofsige (1029–1044)
Wulfric (1044 or 1045–1066)
Thurstan (–1072) – the last Saxon abbot
Theodwin (secular governor)
Godfrey (secular governor)
Simeon (1082–1094) – began building the cathedral
Ranulf Flambard (as custodian 1093–1100)
Richard FitzRichard de Clare (1100–1107) – the last abbot
Hervey, Bishop of Bangor (as custodian 1107–1109)

List of bishops (1109—) 
From then on, Ely was under the Bishop of Ely.

Pre-Reformation bishops

Bishops during the Reformation

Post-Reformation bishops

Assistant bishops
Among those who have served as assistant bishops of the diocese have been:
1907–1914: Noel Hodges, Rector of St Cuthbert's, Bedford; also Archdeacon of Bedford from 1910 (former Bishop of Travancore and Cochin and Assistant Bishop of Durham; later of St Albans)
19191941 (d.): Horace Price, Archdeacon of Ely, Vicar of Pampisford (until 1921) and Canon Residentiary of Ely Cathedral (from 1921); former Bishop in Fukien
19421971 (d.): Gordon Walsh, Canon Residentiary of Ely Cathedral (until 1967), Vice-Dean of Ely (1956–1967) and former Bishop of Hokkaido

See also 
 Lands and Liberties of the Church at Ely

Notes

References

Further reading
Peter Meadows, ed., Ely: Diocese and Bishops, 1109-2009 (The Boydell Press, 2010).

Ely

 
Bishops of Ely

no:Ely bispedømme#Biskoper